The 14795 / 96 Bhiwani–Kalka Ekta Express is an Express train belonging to Indian Railways – Northern Railway zone that runs between  &  in India.

It operates as train number 14795 from Bhiwani to Kalka and as train number 14796 in the reverse direction, serving the state of Haryana & the Union Territory of Chandigarh.

Coaches

The 14795 / 96 Bhiwani–Kalka Ekta Express has 1 AC Chair Car, 8 Second Class seating, 6 General Unreserved & 2 SLR (Seating cum Luggage Rake) coaches. It does not carry a pantry car.

As is customary with most train services in India, coach composition may be amended at the discretion of Indian Railways depending on demand.

Service

Routing

Traction

As the route is yet to be fully electrified, a Ludhiana-based WDM-3A locomotive powers the train between Bhiwani and  following which it is powered by a Ghaziabad-based WAP-7 for the remainder of its journey.

References

External links

Transport in Kalka
Express trains in India
Rail transport in Haryana